The canton of Alfortville is an administrative division of the Val-de-Marne department, Île-de-France region, northern France. It was created at the French canton reorganisation which came into effect in March 2015. Its seat is in Alfortville.

It consists of the following communes:
Alfortville

References

Cantons of Val-de-Marne